Kondalampatti is a Zonal Region in Salem City consisting of 15 wards in the Indian state of Tamil Nadu.  Thiru. N. Palanisamy is the councillor from this region.

Demographics

Population 
 India census, Kondalampatti had a population of 20,000. Males constitute 50% of the population and females 50%. Kondalampatti has an average literacy rate of 52%, lower than the national average of 59.5%: male literacy is 61%, and female literacy is 42%. In Kondalampatti, 13% of the population is under 6 years of age. Salem Corporation consists of 60 wards categorized under 4 Zonal Offices namely Suramangalam Zonal, Hasthampatty Zonal, Ammapet Zonal, Kondalampatty Zonal.

Languages 
Tamil is the official language. Kondalampatty consists of considerable population speaking Kannada. The Kannada spoken here is not pure, as it is spoken in Tamil slang.

Economy
Major revenue is generated from the silk yarn trading, silk sarees manufacturing and trading. Major trading partner towns are Kanchipuram, Arni and Dharmawaram.

Education

College
Salem Sowde College,

Government law college,Salem

Schools
Government Boys Higher secondary school.
Salem Sri Sowdeswari Matric Hr.sec.school.
Sri Vidhya Bharathi Matric Hr.sec.school.
Sri Vidhya Mandir CBSE school.

References

https://web.archive.org/web/20130525235102/http://www.salemcorporation.gov.in/about-corporation.html

Neighbourhoods in Salem, Tamil Nadu